John William Provine (June 19, 1866 – November 2, 1949) was an American chemistry professor and university president. He served as the president of Mississippi College from 1895 to 1898 and from 1911 to 1932. He was the last president of the Southern Intercollegiate Athletic Association.

References

External links

1866 births
1949 deaths
American chemists
Mississippi College
Heads of universities and colleges in the United States